Beşatlı is a village in Yüksekova District in Hakkâri Province in Turkey. The village is populated by Kurds of the Pinyanişî tribe and had a population of 720 in 2022.

The hamlet of Çakmak is attached to the village.

History 
The village was populated by 16 Assyrian families in 1850 and 10 families in 1877.

Population 
Population history of the village from 2000 to 2022:

References 

Villages in Yüksekova District
Kurdish settlements in Hakkâri Province
Historic Assyrian communities in Turkey